St. Cloud is a city in the U.S. state of Minnesota and the largest population center in the state's central region. The population was 68,881 at the 2020 census, making it Minnesota's 12th-largest city. St. Cloud is the county seat of Stearns County and was named after the city of Saint-Cloud, France (in Île-de-France, near Paris), which was named after the 6th-century French monk Clodoald.

Though mostly in Stearns County, St. Cloud also extends into Benton and Sherburne counties, and straddles the Mississippi River. It is the center of a contiguous urban area, with Waite Park, Sauk Rapids, Sartell, St. Joseph, Rockville, and St. Augusta directly bordering the city, and Foley, Rice, Kimball, Clearwater, Clear Lake, and Cold Spring nearby. The St. Cloud metropolitan area had a population of 199,671 at the 2020 census. It has been listed as the fifth-largest metro with a presence in Minnesota, behind Minneapolis–St. Paul, Duluth–Superior, Fargo-Moorhead, and Rochester. But the entire St. Cloud area is entirely in Minnesota, while most of Fargo-Moorhead's population is in North Dakota and Superior, Wisconsin, contributes significant population to the Duluth area.

The St. Cloud Metropolitan Statistical Area (MSA) is made up of Stearns and Benton Counties. The city was included in a newly defined Minneapolis–St. Paul–St. Cloud Combined Statistical Area (CSA) in 2000. St. Cloud as a whole has never been part of the 13-county MSA comprising Minneapolis, St. Paul, Bloomington and parts of western Wisconsin.

St. Cloud State University, Minnesota's third-largest public university, is located between the downtown area and the Beaver Islands, which form a maze for a two-mile stretch of the Mississippi. The approximately 30 undeveloped islands are a popular destination for kayak and canoe enthusiasts and are part of a state-designated 12-mile stretch of wild and scenic river.

St. Cloud owns and operates a hydroelectric dam on the Mississippi, the state's largest city-owned hydro facility, that can produce almost nine megawatts of electricity, about 10% of the total electricity generated by 11 Mississippi hydro dams in Minnesota.

History
What is now the St. Cloud area was occupied by various indigenous peoples for thousands of years. Europeans encountered the Ottawa, Ojibwe, and Winnebago when they started to trade with Native American peoples. 

Minnesota was organized as a territory in 1849. The St. Cloud area was opened up to settlers in 1851 after treaty negotiations with the Winnebago (Ho-Chunk) tribe in 1851 and 1852. John Wilson, a Maine native with French Huguenot ancestry and an interest in Napoleon, named the settlement St. Cloud after Saint-Cloud, the Paris suburb where Napoleon had his favorite palace. 

St. Cloud was a waystation on the Middle and Woods branches of the Red River Trails used by Métis traders between the Canada–US border at Pembina, North Dakota and St. Paul. The cart trains often consisted of hundreds of oxcarts. The Métis, bringing furs to trade for supplies to take back to their rural settlements, would camp west of the city and cross the Mississippi in St. Cloud or just to the north in Sauk Rapids

The City of St. Cloud was incorporated in 1856. It developed from three distinct settlements, known as Upper Town, Middle Town, and Lower Town, that were established by European-American settlers starting in 1853. Remnants of the deep ravines that separated the three are still visible today. Middle Town was settled primarily by Catholic German immigrants and migrants from eastern states, who were recruited to the region by Father Francis Xavier Pierz, a Catholic priest who also ministered as a missionary to Native Americans. 

Lower Town was founded by settlers from the Northern Tier of New England and the mid-Atlantic states, including former residents of upstate New York. Lower Town's Protestant settlers opposed slavery.

Upper Town, or Arcadia, was plotted by General Sylvanus Lowry, a slaveholder and trader from Kentucky who brought slaves with him, although Minnesota was organized as a free territory. He served on the territorial Council from 1852 to 1853 and was elected president of the newly formed town council in 1856, serving for one year (the office of mayor did not yet exist).

Jane Grey Swisshelm, an abolitionist newspaper editor who had migrated from Pittsburgh, repeatedly attacked Lowry in print. At one point Lowry organized a "Committee of Vigilance" that broke into Swisshelm's newspaper office and removed her press, throwing it into the Mississippi River. Lowry started a rival paper, The Union.

The US Supreme Court's 1857 decision in Dred Scott ruled that slaves could not file freedom suits and found the Missouri Compromise unconstitutional, so the territory's prohibition against slavery became unenforceable. Nearly all Southerners left the St. Cloud area when the Civil War broke out, taking their slaves with them. Lowry died in the city in 1865.

Beginning in 1864, Stephen Miller served a two-year term as Minnesota governor, the only citizen of St. Cloud ever to hold the office. Miller was a "Pennsylvania German businessman", lawyer, writer, active abolitionist, and personal friend of Alexander Ramsey. He was on the state's Republican electoral ticket with Abraham Lincoln in 1860.

Steamboats regularly docked at St. Cloud as part of the fur trade and other commerce, although river levels were not reliable. This ended with the construction of the Coon Rapids Dam in 1912–14. Granite quarries have operated in the area since the 1880s, giving St. Cloud its nickname, "The Granite City."

In 1917, Samuel Pandolfo started the Pan Motor Company in St. Cloud. Pandolfo claimed his Pan-Cars would make St. Cloud the new Detroit but the company failed at a time when resources were directed toward the World War I effort. He was later convicted and imprisoned for attempting to defraud investors.

Geography

The city is bisected by the Mississippi River, and part of the Sauk River runs along its northern edge.

Just south of downtown is the 7-acre, 35-feet-deep Lake George. In 2021, the Minnesota Pollution Control Agency (MPCA) credited decade long-city investments in stormwater filtration with reducing Lake George's phosphorus levels well below the state standard. It called Lake George one of three "success stories" in the state, and planned to remove it from a list of impaired waters.

Granite bedrock quarried in the area has been estimated to be 1.7 billion years old and was exposed after several miles of rock above it eroded. The city lies on a band of modern Mississippi river sediment surrounded by land scoured several times by Wisconsin Age glaciers beginning about 35,000 years ago, ending with the Lake Superior St. Croix lobe. The later Des Moines lobe created glacial moraines and drift south and east of the city.

Climate
St. Cloud lies in the warm summer humid continental climate zone (Köppen climate classification: Dfb), with warm summers and cold winters with moderate to heavy snowfall. The record high temperature is 107 °F (42 °C). The record low temperature is -43 °F (-42 °C).

Demographics

2020 census

Note: the US Census treats Hispanic/Latino as an ethnic category. This table excludes Latinos from the racial categories and assigns them to a separate category. Hispanics/Latinos can be of any race.

St. Cloud is the principal city of the St. Cloud Metropolitan Statistical Area, a metropolitan area that covers Sherburne, Benton and Stearns counties and had a combined population of 199,671 at the 2020 census, an increase of 5.59% since 2010.

2010 census
As of the census of 2010, there were 65,842 people, 25,439 households, and 13,348 families residing in the city. The racial makeup of the city was 84.6% White, 7.8% African American, 0.7% Native American, 3.7% Asian, 0.8% from other races, and 2.5% from two or more races. Hispanic or Latino of any race were 2.4% of the population.

There were 25,439 households, of which 25.0% had children under the age of 18 living with them, 37.6% were married couples living together, 10.4% had a female householder with no husband present, 4.5% had a male householder with no wife present, and 47.5% were non-families. 30.8% of all households were made up of individuals, and 7.8% had someone living alone who was 65 years of age or older. The average household size was 2.37 and the average family size was 2.95.

The median age in the city was 28.8 years. 18.9% of residents were under the age of 18; 23.9% were between the ages of 18 and 24; 25.5% were from 25 to 44; 21.5% were from 45 to 64; and 10.3% were 65 years of age or older. The gender makeup of the city was 51.5% male and 48.5% female.

2000 census
As of the census of 2000, 27.3% of St. Cloud households had children under the age of 18 living with them, 41.4% were married couples living together, 9.4% had a female householder with no husband present, and 45.9% were non-families. 30.2% of all households were made up of individuals, and 8.0% had someone living alone who was 65 years of age or older. The average household size was 2.40 and the average family size was 3.00.

The racial makeup of the city was 91.7% White, 2.4% African American, 0.7% Native American, 3.1% Asian, 0.7% other races, and 1.4% from two or more races. Hispanic or Latino of any race were 1.3% of the population.

Average income
According to the U.S. Bureau of Labor Statistics, as of May 2020 the annual mean wage for 99,600 employees across all occupations in St. Cloud was $50,800. The median hourly wage was $24.42.

Top employers
According to St. Cloud's 2020 Comprehensive Annual Financial Report, 
the top employers in the city are:

Arts, culture and events
In 2019 the city of Saint Cloud, Minnesota was awarded three first places awards from the Rome based International Awards for Liveable Communities (LivCom), one of several most livable cities awards.  The city won the first-place whole city award for its size and first-place for cities of all sizes for Enhancement of landscapes and public spaces, Arts, culture and heritage management and Community participation and empowerment.  The international organization praised the city for its focus on improving parkland and trails, as well as its enhancements and maintenace of 96 parks.  The city has been a finalist at the LivCom awards four times since 2007.

The St. Cloud Area Convention and Visitors Bureau promotes an area events calendar, dining and lodging information. The city-owned St. Cloud River's Edge Convention Center hosts a variety of events including regional conferences, consumer/trade shows, small group meetings and social events.

Sites of interest
 Cathedral of Saint Mary, the largest church serving the oldest parish in the community, built in the 1920s in the Italian Romanesque style. The cathedral is the mother church of the Roman Catholic Diocese of Saint Cloud.
 The St. Cloud Commercial Historic District is listed on the National Register of Historic Places. St. Cloud is a Preserve America Community.
 St. Cloud State University.
 Great River Regional Library, a six-county regional system serving 32 communities. The system houses nearly 1 million books, CDs and DVDs and 250 public computers and schedules a list of events.
 Munsinger Gardens and Clemens Gardens, extensive flower gardens dating from the 1930s.
 Quarry Park and Nature Preserve, a public park that features 20 granite quarries, hiking, biking and ski trails. Part of the Stearns County park system.
 Paramount Theatre and Visual Arts Center, a restored 706-seat theater, built in 1921.
 St. Cloud Hospital, part of CentraCare Health, was founded in 1886 as St. Benedict's Hospital. The regional health system also includes six Critical Access hospitals, Rice Memorial Hospital in Willmar and numerous outreach and outpatient clinics and services.
 Stearns History Museum, with two floors of exhibits, a research area, a museum store, and a  nature park. The only county museum in Minnesota accredited by the American Alliance of Museums.
 Minnesota Amateur Baseball Hall of Fame, dedicated to preserving Minnesota's baseball history.
 St. Cloud River's Edge Convention Center, a  meeting center overlooking the Mississippi River.
 St. Cloud Regional Airport, providing scheduled commercial turboprop passenger service, private, corporate, cargo and military operations.
 St. Cloud Technical and Community College, a member of the Minnesota State Colleges and Universities System.
 Minnesota Correctional Facility – St. Cloud, built in 1889, housing nearly 1,000 prisoners.
 Midtown Square Mall, a shopping mall with more than 50 tenants
 Crossroads Center, a shopping mall with more than 100 tenants

Sports
The city is home to:
the St. Cloud State University Division I ice hockey teams. Men's Husky Hockey competes in the National Collegiate Hockey Conference. Women's Husky Hockey competes in the Western Collegiate Hockey Association. The men's team has made nine NCAA Men's Ice Hockey Championship appearances, notably advancing to the 2013 Frozen Four in Pittsburgh, Penn. The 2012-13 team's co-captain and fifth-year forward, Drew LeBlanc, was named WCHA Player of the Year and earned numerous national honors, including the Hobey Baker Award, the most prestigious award in men's college hockey. The 2013 team also earned a share of the WCHA league title and its symbol, the century-old MacNaughton Cup. The Huskies play in the 5,763-seat Herb Brooks National Hockey Center, which underwent a $18 million renovation and expansion in 2012–13.
the St. Cloud Norsemen, a Tier II junior hockey team at the Municipal Athletic Complex.
the Granite City Lumberjacks, a Tier III junior hockey team in nearby Sauk Rapids.
the St. Cloud Rox (formerly the River Bats) of the Northwoods League, a collegiate summer baseball league. The Rox play at Joe Faber Field in St. Cloud and were founded in 2012.
the Saint Cloud Area Roller Dolls, a flat-track roller derby league founded in 2011.
the Saint Cloud River Runners club, who put on the Lake Wobegon Trail Marathon, an annual event in central Minnesota. The race is used as a Boston-qualifying event for runners who want a straight, quiet, scenic, mostly flat route in the early spring.
the Granite City FC is a minor league soccer team founded in 2016. It currently plays in the United Premier Soccer League (UPSL).

Parks and recreation
The largest developed park, Whitney Memorial Park, is the former location of the city airport. It features a recreation center for senior citizens, a dog park, and numerous softball, baseball, and soccer fields.

Government
Since 2005, St. Cloud's mayor has been Dave Kleis. He was reelected to a fifth term in 2020.

St. Cloud has been moved by Congressional redistricting to a wide variety of Minnesota regions, including northern, south central, northwest and southwest. In Congressional district maps in effect since 2003, it has been grouped with rural areas and suburbs north and west of the Twin Cities. The district had only minor changes in a 2022 map drawn by a five-judge panel based on the 2020 census. St. Cloud is the largest city in Minnesota's 6th congressional district, represented by Republican Tom Emmer.

The city makes up the majority of population of Minnesota State Senate District 14, which straddles the Mississippi River and includes parts of three counties, represented by Aric Putnam. Minnesota House District 14A includes generally western parts of the city as well as Waite Park, St. Augusta and adjacent rural areas, represented by Dan Wolgamott. District 14B includes east central and northeast St. Cloud, neighboring Sauk Rapids and parts of rural Benton and Sherburne Counties, represented by Tama Theis.

In 2016, St. Cloud converted from 5% to 80% renewable energy by using solar gardens, street light improvements, bio-gas, and other energy efficiency initiatives. St. Cloud's wastewater plant converts sugar-laden liquids from local food and beer manufacturers into fuel and fertilizer. Since 2020, the city has produced more energy than it consumes.

Past mayors of St. Cloud include:
Sylvanus B. Lowry (1856), selected by town council members as council president (office of mayor did not yet exist)

John L. Wilson (1857–1858)
E. O. Hamlin (1868)
J. A. McDonald (1900)
J. R. Boyd (1901)
J. E. C. Robinson (1902–1905 and 1906)
J. N. Bensen (1905)
David McCarty (1907)
Louis Brown (1907)
Hugh Evans (1908–1909)
D. H. Freeman (1910 and 1916–1919)
P. J. Seberger (1911–1912)
H. J. Limperich (1919)
W. W. Matson (1920–1924). 19th Amendment gives women the right to vote.
J. Arthur Bensen (1924–1928)
James H. Murphy (1928–1932, 1945–1948)
Phil Collignon (1932–1945)
Mathew Malisheski (1948–1952)
Lawrence A. Borgert (1952). City Charter revised, creating current "standard mayor form" of government.
George Byers (1953–1960)
Thomas E. Mealey (1960–1964)
Ed Henry (1964–1971)
Al Loehr (1971–1980)
Sam Huston (1980–1989)
Chuck Winkelman (1989–1997)
Larry Meyer (1997–2001)
John Ellenbecker (2001–2005)

Politics
President Joe Biden and Vice President Kamala Harris won St. Cloud's votes in the 2020 presidential election by a margin of 9%, higher than the state margin of 7.12%. In 2016, former President Donald Trump won St. Cloud by 1.75% over Democratic nominee Hillary Clinton.

Education

Almost all of St. Cloud, including the portions in Stearns and Sherburne Counties, and much the portion in Benton County, is in the St. Cloud Public School District. A portion of Benton County St. Cloud is in the Sauk Rapids-Rice Public Schools district.

The St. Cloud Area School District serves St. Cloud, St. Augusta, Clearwater, Waite Park, St. Joseph, Haven Township, and parts of Sauk Rapids. It has eight elementary schools, a new K-8 school in St. Joseph, and two major public high schools, St. Cloud Technical High School and St. Cloud Apollo High School. St. Cloud also has a major private high school, Cathedral High School. Both public high schools offer a broad selection of Advanced Placement courses and rank high in the state in the number of AP tests taken and of test takers. St. Cloud Tech opened in 1917 across from a city park and Lake George. In 2019, it moved to a new 69-acre, $104 million facility on the southwest edge of the city. The historic 1917 building has been acquired for use by city government. Apollo opened in 1970 and serves the expanding north side of the city. Other high schools and secondary schools that serve St. Cloud include St. Robert Bellarmine's Academy, St. Cloud Christian School, Immaculate Conception Academy, St. John's Preparatory School, St. Cloud Alternative Learning Center, and the charter school STRIDE Academy, which is K-8. The nearby cities of Sauk Rapids and Sartell also have their own school districts and high schools, bringing the number of public high schools in the metropolitan area to four.

Colleges
St. Cloud is home to several higher education institutions, including Minnesota's third-largest university, St. Cloud State University. St. Cloud State's fall 2020 enrollment was 12,607, in a year affected by the COVID-19 pandemic.

St. Cloud's other post-secondary institutions and campuses include St. Cloud Technical and Community College (SCTCC) and Rasmussen College. Neighboring Sartell is home to a campus of the Duluth-based College of St. Scholastica, and the College of St. Benedict and St. John's University are in neighboring St. Joseph and nearby Collegeville, respectively.

Media
The main newspaper is the St. Cloud Times, a Gannett daily newspaper.

St. Cloud is part of the Twin Cities television market. One full-power station, the Ion-owned KPXM-TV (channel 41), is licensed to the city, but moved its transmitter to the Twin Cities in 2009 as part of the digital transition, and maintains no presence in the city. WCMN-LD (channel 13) is a low-power station licensed to St. Cloud that broadcasts in ATSC 3.0. Additionally, St. Cloud State University students operate cable-only UTVS (channel 180), which includes local news and broadcasts from a studio on campus.

Radio stations include:

FM

AM

Infrastructure

Transportation
St. Cloud is a regional transportation hub within Minnesota. Major roadways including Interstate Highway 94, U.S. Highway 10, and Minnesota State Highways 15 and 23 pass through the city.

Bus service within the city and to neighboring Sartell, Sauk Rapids, and Waite Park is offered through St. Cloud Metro Bus, which was recognized in 2007 as the best transit system of its size in North America. An innovative system gives transit buses a slight advantage at stoplights in order to improve efficiency and on-time performance. The Metro Bus Transit Center in the downtown area is also shared with Jefferson Lines, providing national bus service.

Bus service links downtown St. Cloud and St. Cloud State University with the western terminus of the Northstar Commuter Rail line in Big Lake, by the way of Northstar Link Commuter Bus, which in turn links to the Metro Transit bus and light rail system at Target Field Station in downtown Minneapolis.

Several rail lines run through the city, which is a stop on Amtrak's Empire Builder passenger rail line.

St. Cloud is home to St. Cloud Regional Airport, from which daily connecting flights to Minneapolis–Saint Paul International Airport were made on Delta Connection, operated by Mesaba Airlines, until January 1, 2010, when the service was discontinued. On December 15, 2012, Allegiant Air began nonstop flights between St. Cloud Regional Airport and Phoenix-Mesa Gateway Airport, on McDonnell Douglas MD-80 aircraft.

Major highways
  Interstate 94
  U.S. Highway 10
  Minnesota State Highway 15
  Minnesota State Highway 23

Notable people

Halima Aden, model and first Somali-American to compete for Miss Minnesota
Mathew Ahmann, civil rights activist
Raymond H. Bares, Minnesota state senator and educator
Tom Burgmeier, Major League Baseball player; grew up in St. Cloud and attended Cathedral High School
Loren W. Collins, Minnesota jurist and legislator; mayor of St. Cloud
David Durenberger, U.S. senator from Minnesota
Jim Eisenreich, MLB player
Janice Ettle, five-time competitor at the woman's US Olympic Marathon Trials, two-time winner of Grandma's Marathon and winner of the 1985 Twin Cities Marathon
Jim Fahnhorst, NFL player
Keith Fahnhorst, NFL player
Howard M. Fish, retired U.S. Air Force lieutenant general, former assistant vice chief of staff of Air Force
Charles A. Gilman, ninth lieutenant governor of Minnesota
Janey Gohl, 1978 Miss Minnesota USA
Lawrence M. Hall, longest-serving Speaker of the Minnesota House of Representatives
Keith F. Hughes, Minnesota state senator and lawyer
Jack I. Kleinbaum, businessman, St. Cloud City Council member, and Minnesota state legislator
Dave Kleis, mayor of St. Cloud
Jim Knoblach, Republican member of the Minnesota House of Representatives
Franklin J. Knoll, Minnesota state legislator, lawyer, and judge
June Marlowe, actress notable for playing Miss Crabtree in short-film series Our Gang
John McMartin, film, television and stage actor
Stephen Miller, abolitionist, Civil War veteran, Republican politician, fourth governor of Minnesota
Edgar G. Mills, Wisconsin state assemblyman and senator
William P. Murphy, associate justice of Minnesota Supreme Court
Jim Pehler, Minnesota state legislator
Tom Petters, former CEO and chair of Petters Group Worldwide
Reynold Philipsek, gypsy jazz guitarist
Dewey H. Reed, educator and politician
Alise Willoughby, BMX racer and Olympic silver medalist.
Michael Sauer, NHL player
 Anne Schleper, women's hockey Olympic silver medalist, 2014
Nate Schmidt, NHL player
Stephen Sommers, film director, alumnus of Cathedral High School and St. John's University
Charles Thomas Stearns, politician
Jane Swisshelm, newspaper owner, editor and abolitionist
Craig Thomas, television writer and producer, co-creator of How I Met Your Mother
Gene Waldorf, electrical engineer and politician
Nate Wolters, professional basketball player
Gig Young, Academy Award-winning actor, film and television star; born in St. Cloud

Sister cities
  Spalt, Bavaria, Germany
  Akita, Japan

In popular culture
Season 3 of FX's Fargo depicts St. Cloud as the residence of both Ray Stussy (Ewan McGregor) and Nikki Swango (Mary Elizabeth Winstead), but was not filmed there.
Courtroom scenes in the Disney Film The Mighty Ducks were filmed in St. Cloud, and a few scenes were filmed at the Municipal Athletic Complex (MAC) but did not make the final film.
Al Franken and Tom Davis's One More Saturday Night is set in St. Cloud, but was not filmed there.
Juno was partially set in St. Cloud, which is referred to as "East Jesus Nowhere", though no filming took place in the city.
The song "On a Bus to St. Cloud", by Gretchen Peters, is on Trisha Yearwood's 1995 album Thinkin' About You.
In 2005, Penn & Teller: Bullshit! shot an episode on the SCSU campus.
In the 2007 horror movie 1408, St. Cloud is mentioned as one of the scariest places the protagonist has visited while investigating haunted houses.
Judith Guest and Rebecca Hill's novel Killing Time in St. Cloud is set in the eponymous city.
John Bellairs's character Mr. Emerson is from St. Cloud.
In the novel The Death and Life of Charlie St. Cloud by Ben Sherwood, the main character's mother grew up in the city.
In the sitcom How I Met Your Mother, Marshall Eriksen is from St. Cloud. Throughout the series, St. Cloud is visited by several characters several times, but is portrayed as a much smaller town than it is in reality.
The 1989 film Catch Me If You Can was shot in St. Cloud
 In the 1990 children's book, Blumpoe the Grumpoe Meets Arnold the Cat, protagonist Horace P. Blumpoe's sister Edith lives in St. Cloud, and Horace visits her every year in November.

See also
 1998 St. Cloud explosion
 Dave Torrey Arena

References

External links

 City Website
 St. Cloud Area Chamber of Commerce
 St. Cloud News on Forth

 
Cities in Benton County, Minnesota
Cities in Minnesota
Cities in Sherburne County, Minnesota
Cities in Stearns County, Minnesota
County seats in Minnesota
Minnesota populated places on the Mississippi River
Populated places established in 1853
St. Cloud, Minnesota metropolitan area
1853 establishments in Minnesota Territory